Megachile modesta is a species of bee in the family Megachilidae. It was described by Smith in 1862.

References

Modesta
Insects described in 1862